Li Ying (born 21 October 1973) is a Chinese former footballer who played as a midfielder for the China women's national team.

Career
Li was included in China's squad for the 1995 FIFA Women's World Cup in Sweden. The team managed to reach the semi-finals, where they lost the Germany. The team subsequently finished fourth after losing in the third place play-off against the United States.

References

External links
 
 

1973 births
Living people
Chinese women's footballers
China women's international footballers
Women's association football midfielders
1995 FIFA Women's World Cup players